The agreeable tiger moth (Spilosoma congrua) is one of three species of white tiger moth which are common in the United States. It has pronounced black eyes, white abdomen, and orange "bib" which set it apart from its cousin the Virginia tiger moth. Like its cousin, it tents its wings when
at rest.

It was described by Francis Walker in 1855. It is found in the United States, Canada, and possibly India.

References

 

Spilosoma congrua at EOL
Spilosoma congrua at BHL
Catalogue of the described Lepidoptera of North America (1860)

Spilosoma
Moths of North America
Moths described in 1855